Rabbi Barry Marcus  (born 28 October 1949) is a Rabbi of the Central Synagogue, Great Portland Street located in the West End of London, notable for his rabbinical and pastoral duties in the UK, Israel and South Africa.

In 2015 he was awarded MBE in the New Year Honours for services to Holocaust Education.

Background
Marcus was born in Johannesburg, South Africa on 28 October 1949. In 1996 he served as Rabbi to Waverley Hebrew Congregation, one of the largest Jewish communities in Johannesburg. Before becoming the Rabbi of the Central Synagogue he served as a rabbi in Israel.

Controversy
In 2015 Rabbi Marcus spoke out in defence of John Galliano, fashion designer who was found guilty of racism and antisemitic abuse in 2011.

Holocaust education
Since November 2008 Rabbi Marcus has been organising educational trips to Auschwitz together with the Holocaust Education Trust.

Awards and notable appointments
In 2014, Rabbi Marcus was awarded the Knight's Cross of the Order of Merit of the Republic of Poland for Holocaust education and for fostering dialogue and building bridges with Poland. He is a member of advisory board of Lithuanian Jewish Heritage Project.

See also
 Central Synagogue, Great Portland Street
 Orthodox Judaism
 Rabbis

References

1949 births
Living people
20th-century English rabbis
21st-century English rabbis
British Orthodox rabbis
Jewish educators
Members of the Order of the British Empire
Naturalised citizens of the United Kingdom
Rabbis from London
South African rabbis